John Gottowt (born Isidor Gesang; 15 June 1881 – 29 August 1942) was an Austrian actor, stage director and  film director for theatres and silent movies.

Gottowt was born in Lemberg, Austria-Hungary (present-day Lviv, Ukraine) into a Jewish family. After his education in Vienna, he joined the Deutsches Theater in Berlin in 1905, working for Max Reinhardt as an actor and director. Gottowt was mainly active in different theatres in Berlin as a character actor and director.

His first silent film appearance was in Paul Wegener’s Der Student von Prag ("The Student of Prague") (1913). In 1920 he appeared in Robert Wiene's Genuine and took the main role in the early science fiction film Algol. In 1921 he played Professor Bulwer (Abraham van Helsing) in the classic silent film Nosferatu directed by F.W. Murnau.

Gottowt made also several films with his brother-in-law Henrik Galeen but, as a Jew, was banned in 1933 from working as a professional actor. After a few years in Denmark he moved to Kraków in Poland. He was murdered in 1942 by an SS officer while in hiding in Wieliczka, disguised as a Roman Catholic priest.

List of films 

 Der Student von Prag (1913, directed by Stellan Rye), as Scapinelli
 Das schwarze Los / Pierrots letztes Abenteuer (1913, directed by John Gottowt & Emil Albes), as Brighella
 Die büßende Magdalena (1915, directed by Emil Albes)
 Satan Opium (1915, directed by Siegfried Dessauer)
 The Princess of Neutralia (1917, directed by Rudolf Biebrach), as Joe Vandergolt, billionaire
 Peer Gynt. 1. Peer Gynts Jugend (1918, directed by Victor Barnowsky), as Dovregubben
 Peer Gynt 2. Wanderjahre und Tod (1918, directed by Victor Barnowsky), as Dovregubben
 Morphium (1919, directed by Bruno Ziener)
 Der rote Henker (1919, directed by Rudolf Biebrach), as L'Angely, court jester
 The Forbidden Way (1920, directed by Henrik Galeen), as Lucas
 Genuine (1920, directed by Robert Wiene), as Guyard, barber
 The Night of Queen Isabeau (1920, directed by Robert Wiene), as humpbacked court jester
 Der Bucklige und die Tänzerin (1920, directed by F.W. Murnau), as James Wilton
 Niemand weiß es (1920, directed by Lupu Pick) - Screenwriter
 Algol (1920, directed by Hans Werckmeister), as alien from the planet Algol
 Die tote Stunde (1920, directed by Friedrich Feher)
 Parisian Women (1921, directed by Leo Lasko), as Aristide
 Burning Country (1921, directed by Heinz Herald), as Wladislaus
 Susanne Stranzky (1921, directed by Otto Rippert)
 Nosferatu, eine Symphonie des Grauens (1922, directed by F.W. Murnau), as Professor Bulwer (van Helsing)
 The Black Star (1922, directed by James Bauer)
 Elixiere des Teufels (1922, directed by Adolf Abter)
 The False Dimitri (1922, directed by Hans Steinhoff), as Ivan's court jester
 The Money Devil (1923, directed by Heinz Goldberg), as Black
 Waxworks (1923, directed by Paul Leni), as the wax museum's owner
 Menschenopfer (1923, directed by Carl Wilhelm)
 Should We Be Silent? (1926, directed by Richard Oswald), as the doctor's assistant
 The Flight in the Night (1926, directed by Amleto Palermi), as a servant
 Prinz Louis Ferdinand (1927, directed by Hans Behrendt), as newspaper editor
 Unheimliche Geschichten (1932, directed by Richard Oswald), as official of the mechanic museum

References 

 Pioniere in Celluloid, Juden in den frühen Filmwelt, Stratenwerth, Simon (Hg), Henschel Verlag, Berlin, 2004, www.henschel-verlag.de
 KARTA 42 – 2004, Fundacja Ośrodka KARTA, 02-536 Warszawa, www.karta.org.pl
 Dotknięcie anioła (The Kiss of an Angel), Henryk Schönker, 2005, Ośrodek KARTA, 02-536 Warszawa, www.karta.org.pl
 Ich war acht und wollte leben, Heinrich Schönker, 2008, Patmos Verlag 
 Archives of British Film Institute, London

External links 
 
 filmportal.de

Austrian male film actors
Austrian male silent film actors
20th-century Austrian male actors
1881 births
1942 deaths
Actors from Lviv
People from the Kingdom of Galicia and Lodomeria
Austro-Hungarian Jews
Jews from Galicia (Eastern Europe)
Jewish Austrian male actors
Ukrainian Jews
People murdered in Poland
Austrian Jews who died in the Holocaust